Oleksiy Hodin (born 2 February 1983 in Zaporizhzhia) is a Ukrainian football coach and former midfielder who played for Metalurh Zaporizhzhia.

Career
He was playing under number 27 at FC Metalurh Zaporizhzhya and signed on 17 June 2009 with FC Metalurh Donetsk.

International career
Hodin was a member of the Ukraine squad which reached the final of the 2006 UEFA European Under-21 Football Championship in Portugal, he played only five games for the Ukraine.

Honours
Ukraine under-21
 UEFA Under-21 Championship: runner-up 2006

References

1983 births
Living people
Footballers from Zaporizhzhia
Ukrainian footballers
Ukrainian footballers banned from domestic competitions
Ukrainian expatriate footballers
Ukrainian Premier League players
FC Metalurh Zaporizhzhia players
FC Metalurh-2 Zaporizhzhia players
SC Tavriya Simferopol players
FC Metalurh Donetsk players
Ukraine youth international footballers
Ukraine under-21 international footballers
Expatriate footballers in Lithuania
Ukrainian expatriate sportspeople in Lithuania
FC Šiauliai players
FC TSK Simferopol players
Association football midfielders
Ukrainian football managers
FC Metalurh Zaporizhzhia managers
FC Kremin Kremenchuk managers